This is a list of mayors of Rorschach, Canton of St. Gallen, Switzerland. The mayor (Stadtpräsident) of Rorschach chairs the city council (Stadtrat). The term Stadtpräsident is used since 2001, before on used Stadtammann. Until 1918, the office was called Gemeindepräsident.

References 

Rorschach
Rorschach, Switzerland
Lists of mayors (complete 1900-2013)